Jack Degruchy (born 13 August 2003) is an English professional footballer who plays for FC United of Manchester, on loan from Doncaster Rovers, as a midfielder.

Career
After playing for York City, Degruchy signed for Doncaster Rovers in July 2022.

He made his league debut for Doncaster Rovers in their 0-0 draw with Bradford City in EFL League Two, being replaced by Josh Andrews after half time.

On 12 September 2022, Degruchy and team-mate Tavonga Kuleya were sent on a youth loan to FC United of Manchester.

References

2003 births
Living people
English footballers
Association football midfielders
English Football League players
York City F.C. players
Doncaster Rovers F.C. players
F.C. United of Manchester players